Ski-Doo: Snowmobile Challenge is a snowmobiling video game developed by Swedish studio ColdWood Interactive and published by Valcon Games for PlayStation 3, Xbox 360, and Wii. The game has a relatively low amount of achievements for Xbox 360 (23)  and trophies for PS3 (28).

Reception
The game received moderate reviews. It got 6.4 out of 10 from IGN, 4.5 out of 10 from Official Xbox Magazine, and 3.5 out of 5 from Cheat Code Central

References

2009 video games
ColdWood Interactive games
Multiplayer and single-player video games
North America-exclusive video games
PlayStation 3 games
Racing video games
Split-screen multiplayer games
Valcon Games games
Video games developed in Sweden
Wii games
Xbox 360 games